Hohenbergia hatschbachii is a plant species in the genus Hohenbergia. This species is endemic to Brazil.

References

hatschbachii
Flora of Brazil